The 2017 Mid-American Conference women's basketball tournament was a post-season basketball tournament for the Mid-American Conference (MAC) 2016–17 college basketball season. Tournament first round games were held on campus sites at the higher seed on March 6. The remaining rounds were held at Quicken Loans Arena in Cleveland between March 8–11. Toledo won their 8th MAC Women's Tournament and received the conference's automatic bid into the 2017 NCAA tournament. Mikaela Boyd of Toledo was the MVP.

Format
Unlike with the recent tournaments, where the top two seeds received byes into the semifinals, with the three and four seeds receiving a bye to the quarterfinals. The tournament reverted to its original structure. The top four seeds received just one bye into the quarterfinals.

Seeds

Schedule

Bracket

First round games at campus sites of lower-numbered seeds

All-Tournament Team
Tournament MVP – Mikaela Boyd, Toledo

See also
2017 MAC men's basketball tournament

References

Mid-American Conference women's basketball tournament
2016–17 Mid-American Conference women's basketball season
2017 in sports in Ohio
Basketball competitions in Cleveland
College basketball tournaments in Ohio
Women's sports in Ohio
2010s in Cleveland